JL Mobile is a technology research and development firm located in Jamaica, specializing in mobile software and hardware solutions for the Caricom market. This firm was started by tech entrepreneur Lloyd Laing and ex-banker Jovan Alston.

History
In early 2010, the company designed and developed a hybrid tablet PC experience code named the SmartTab. The product was brought to market in 2011.

In August 2012, the company partnered with the Mona campus of the University of The West Indies to pilot the "SmartTab" mobile PC as a part of the UWITEST e-books initiative. 

In May 2012, the company announced the launch of ebooksCaribbean.com, a social commerce platform targeting Caribbean oriented authors and publishing houses. The platform was developed in partnership with Caricom Media.

Between June 2012 and March 2013, Nimbleton Investments acquired the assets of Caricom Media and Digital Harbour. The two entities were merged to form Baus CTS (Content Technology Services).

On May 22, 2013, the Jamaica Gleaner announced the company's strategic partnership with Pelican Publishers.

Products
SmartTab - Tablet PC Experience
EbooksCaribbean - Social Commerce Platform for E-Publishers & Authors
AppsCaribbean (beta) - Caribbean marketplace for Caribbean app developers

References

Computer hardware companies
Software companies
Companies based in Kingston, Jamaica